Brasenia, commonly known as watershield, is a genus belonging to the family Cabombaceae, consisting of one species, Brasenia schreberi. It is widely distributed in North America, the West Indies, northern South America (Venezuela, Guyana), eastern Asia (China, Japan, Korea, Primorye), Australia, the Indian Subcontinent, and parts of Africa.

Brasenia is a perennial aquatic plant with floating, peltate leaves and rhizomatous stems.  It is identified by its bright green leaves, small purple flowers that bloom from June through September, and a thick mucilage that covers all of the underwater organs, including the underside of the leaves, stems, and developing buds. This mucilage may be an anti-herbivore defence trait, perhaps to deter snail grazing. It grows in shallow water of lakes, rivers and beaver ponds, particularly those with somewhat acidic water.

Characteristics 

Brasenia exhibits wind pollination.  The flowers have a two-day blooming period. On the first day, the functionally female, or pistillate flower, extends above the surface of the water and exposes the receptive stigmas. The flower then recedes below the water surface and on the following day emerges as a functionally male, or staminate flower.  It is elevated higher than on the previous day and the anther-bearing filaments are extended beyond the female carpels. The anthers dehisce, releasing the pollen, and the flower is then withdrawn below the water where the fruit develops.

Uses 

The mucilage it produces has been found to have anti-algal and anti-bacterial properties that may be useful as a natural weed control

History 
Species of Brasenia occurred during the interglacial of Europe, but like many other aquatic plant species and genera, it does not occur there now.

Name 
Brasenia schreberi (syn. B. nymphoides, B. peltata) has the common name water-shield (also watershield or water shield).

The genus may commemorate the surgeon and Moravian missionary Christoph Brasen (1738-1774), who was the first superintendent of the Moravian mission at Nain in Labrador.

See also 
 List of vegetables

References

External links 

Washington State Department of Ecology: Brasenia schreberi
Jepson Manual Treatment
USDA Plants Profile
Photo gallery

Nymphaeales genera
Monotypic angiosperm genera
Freshwater plants
Flora of North America
Flora of Venezuela
Flora of Asia
Flora of Australia
Flora of Africa
Japanese vegetables
History of the Labrador Province of the Moravian Church
Nymphaeales